The Muli Princely State had an area of  and contained twenty four  villages including Muli city. The Parmar rajputs of fire dynasty (Agnivansha) came to this area from Tharparkar District, Sindh, Pakistan in the 15th century A.D..  Lakhdhirji Parmar named this Princely State after a milkmaid who used to deliver milk to the royal family. Parmars believe in God "Mandavrayaji (The almighty Sun)" thus they have built the big temple of Mandavrayaji at the heart of the city.

The Parmars of Muli are direct descendents of Parmar Vansh of Dhar, Malva Kingdom.

Historical background 
The town is famous for the battle fought between the Chabhads and the Parmars for a wounded partridge. Chabhads wanted possession of the partridge while Parmars wanted to provide asylum to wounded partridge, then happened a great battle between Parmars and Chabhads, this battle has historical importance because 140 Parmars got victory against 500 chabhads.
From that day on, Muli's Parmars vowed never to kill a partridge and accorded it a divine standing. Even during times when partridge hunting was rampant and was a favourite pastime among the royals, killing it was banned in Muli state.

Muli prince Lakhdhirji gave shelter to an outer religious caste and saved their daughter from the Sumra king of Sindh province who wanted possession of her, setting up the principle of secularism from the inception of the dynasty in Zalawad.

Muli is also known for bounteous king Sachoji Parmar who had given lion alive to a charan of Halwad darbar by the courtesy of God Mandavrayaji. This incident is also penned by well-known writer Jhaverchand Meghani in 'Saurashtra ni rasdhar' sculpting the uniqueness and grace of the incident.

There are 24 villages (a paragana) of Parmar rajputs also termed as 'Muli chovisi'

Known for
 The Mandavrayaji Temple (founded in the 15th century)
 The Swaminarayan Temple (Historically important for Swaminarayan Vadtal Sampraday)
 Gnan Vav
 Ambika nivas palace

Educational Institutions
 Dahiben Kanya Vidhyalaya
 Tejendraprasad Boys Highschool
 Shri Saraswati Vidhyamandir
 Shri Sanskar Sarita Vidhyamandir

References

Princely states of India
History of Gujarat
History of Sindh